Raquel Corral Aznar (born 1 December 1980 in Madrid) is a Spanish synchronized swimmer who competed at the 2008 Summer Olympics.

Notes

References

 The Official Website of the Beijing 2008 Olympic Games

External links 
 
 

1980 births
Living people
Spanish synchronized swimmers
Olympic synchronized swimmers of Spain
Olympic medalists in synchronized swimming
Olympic silver medalists for Spain
Synchronized swimmers at the 2004 Summer Olympics
Synchronized swimmers at the 2008 Summer Olympics
Medalists at the 2008 Summer Olympics
World Aquatics Championships medalists in synchronised swimming
Synchronized swimmers at the 2003 World Aquatics Championships
Synchronized swimmers at the 2005 World Aquatics Championships
Synchronized swimmers at the 2009 World Aquatics Championships